The Karko are a sub-ethnic group of the Nuba peoples in the Nuba Mountains of South Kordofan state, in southern Sudan.

They speak Karko, a Nubian language (Sample: "Ambapo ni kitabu chako?" - "Where is your book?").

Most members of this ethnicity are Muslims. The population of this ethnicity exceeds 10,000.

See also
Index: Nuba peoples

References

Nuba peoples
Ethnic groups in Sudan